The Following Is Very True...

Fantom may also refer to:

FANTOM, an international research consortium
Fantom (company), an Irish company producing digital stickers
Fantom (programming language), an object oriented programming language
Fantom (software), a digital trading card software platform
Fantom, a 2016 album by electro-pop group Mœnia
Fantom-6/7/8, a series of music workstations and synthesizers by Roland

See also
Fantome (disambiguation)
Phantom (disambiguation)